Eugenia Sullivan Cooney (born July 27, 1994) is an American YouTuber and Internet personality. She was born in Massachusetts and is based in Greenwich, Connecticut and Los Angeles, California. She initially began livestreaming on broadcasting service YouNow, eventually creating her YouTube channel in 2011, which has garnered over 2 million subscribers. Known for her emo and gothic looks, as well as her eating disorder, Cooney's content mainly involves clothing hauls, beauty, cosplay and vlogs of her daily life. She also regularly livestreams on Twitch.

Life and career 
Cooney was born Colleen Cooney on July 27, 1994, in Boston, Massachusetts. Her first name was changed to Eugenia several months after her birth. Throughout her childhood, Cooney didn't have many friends and was often the victim of bullying at school, which caused her to switch schools multiple times and begin attending an online school after her first year of high school. She transferred to Connections Academy and graduated in 2013. Eugenia Cooney pursued modeling for a brief time in New York. After being asked to remove her online presence and feeling overcontrolled, Cooney decided to instead focus on her online career.

Cooney began her online presence in 2011 by livestreaming on broadcasting service YouNow, later creating her YouTube channel that same year. In 2013, she uploaded a video titled "How to Ratchetly Twerk", which went viral after being shared on WorldStarHipHop. Her first three videos amassed over 7.5 million views. Cooney's YouTube content mainly consists of clothing hauls, vlogs about her daily life, cosplay outfits, and makeup tutorials. She began livestreaming on Twitch in 2018, where she has over 400,000 followers as of August 2022. She is known for her emo style, characterized by her "extraordinarily long, dark hair, gothic lace dresses, and bold, multi-colored makeup looks."

In 2018, Cooney starred in the music video for Niki DeMar's song "Anthem for the Judged". Cooney was nominated and a finalist for "YouTuber of the Year" for the 12th annual Shorty Awards in 2020.

Cooney resides with her family in Greenwich, Connecticut, and also had a residence in Burbank, California.

Controversy
Cooney has an eating disorder, presumably anorexia nervosa. Her critics argue that her content encourages eating disorders among viewers, raising concern about her influence on her young fans. This is despite Cooney seldom referencing her eating disorder. Cooney is a popular figure in online "pro-ana" communities, where her videos and images are used as "thinspiration". Beginning in 2015, viewers began expressing concern around her weight loss, and since then several theories about her health, mental state, and home life have steadily grown. In 2016, a Change.org petition titled "Temporarily Ban Eugenia Cooney off of YouTube" went viral and received 18,000 signatures, although it was later removed for "violating community guidelines". In response to the petition, Cooney denied having a problem and said that she did not intend to be a bad influence.

In early 2019, Cooney's activity online became more infrequent, raising concern among her fans, who thought she had died. On February 10, Cooney announced on her Twitter account that she was taking a hiatus to work "on this with [her] doctor privately." Cooney was assessed by medical professionals and placed under a 5150 hold requested by one of her friends before entering into a month-long treatment program. In July 2019, Cooney reappeared as the subject of Shane Dawson's hour-long YouTube video "The Return of Eugenia Cooney", in which she confirmed the decade-long speculation about her eating disorder and recovery process for the first time. She now describes her experiences as "traumatizing" and claims to be "doing better" now than she was during treatment.

Dawson's video on Cooney was viewed over 27 million times in a month. She was initially praised when she came back to YouTube, with people commending her for her return and being honest about her health. As a result, Cooney was nominated as YouTuber of the Year at the 2020 Shorty Awards. The reaction to "The Return of Eugenia Cooney" video was mixed, with some viewers and mental health experts raising concerns about the future of her treatment, as well as the possible impact on Dawson's mostly young, female audience.

Following the publication of Dawson's documentary, Cooney returned to posting videos. Despite being initially praised for opening up about her struggle with an eating disorder, Cooney was soon criticized again for appearing to relapse. Further, allegations of grooming and predatory behavior of young people by older men on Cooney's Discord server surfaced in 2020, prompting her to delete it in September.

In early 2021 another petition was started on Change.org to age-restrict, or entirely remove, Cooney's YouTube channel and social media accounts, claiming that she promotes eating disorders through her "emaciated" appearance.

Awards and nominations

See also 
 List of people from Greenwich, Connecticut
 List of YouTubers

Footnotes

References

External links 
 Eugenia Cooney on Facebook
 

1994 births
Living people
American YouTubers
YouTube channels launched in 2011
Beauty and makeup YouTubers
YouTube vloggers
Fashion YouTubers
Twitch (service) streamers
YouTube controversies
Cosplayers
People from Boston
People from Greenwich, Connecticut
People with mental disorders
People detained in psychiatric hospitals